The  was an infantry division of the Imperial Japanese Army. It was formed on 1 May 1943 in Anhui province, simultaneously with the 62nd, 63rd and 64th divisions as a security (type C) division. The nucleus for the formation was the 13th Independent mixed brigade from Lu'an. As a security division, it lacked an artillery regiment. The men of the division were drafted from the Aichi mobilization district.

Action
The 65th division was permanently assigned to the 13th army. Initially garrisoning Lu'an, its zone of responsibility was stretched to Xuzhou too, because the 17th division was departing for New Britain and Solomon Islands. The 65th division was garrisoning the assigned areas till the surrender of Japan 15 August 1945.

See also
 List of Japanese Infantry Divisions
Independent Mixed Brigades (Imperial Japanese Army)

Notes
This article incorporates material from Japanese Wikipedia page 第65師団 (日本軍), accessed 14 June 2016

Reference and further reading

 Madej, W. Victor. Japanese Armed Forces Order of Battle, 1937-1945 [2 vols]
Allentown, PA: 1981

Japanese World War II divisions
Infantry divisions of Japan
Military units and formations established in 1943
Military units and formations disestablished in 1945
1943 establishments in Japan
1945 disestablishments in Japan